Otto Lechner (born February 25, 1964) is an Austrian accordionist.

Lechner taught himself to play the accordion starting at age four. He has been blind since age 15. Lechner is currently a member of the group Accordion Tribe and musical director of two ensembles in Vienna, Otto's Jazz Ensemble and Das Erste Wiener Strenge Kammerorchester. He lives in Vienna with his partner and collaborator, Anne Bennent.

References

External links
 Otto Lechner's homepage
 Accordion Tribe homepage

1964 births
Living people
Austrian accordionists
Blind musicians
21st-century accordionists